The 2014 United States House of Representatives elections in Georgia were held on Tuesday, November 4, 2014, to elect the 14 U.S. representatives from the state of Georgia, one from each of the state's 14 congressional districts. The elections coincided with the elections of other federal and state offices, including Governor of Georgia and U.S. Senator.

Overview

By district
Results of the 2014 United States House of Representatives elections in Georgia by district:

District 1
Incumbent Republican representative Jack Kingston did not run for re-election, instead running unsuccessfully for the U.S. Senate seat held by retiring Republican Saxby Chambliss.

Republican primary

Candidates

Nominee 
 Buddy Carter, state senator

Eliminated in primary
 Darwin Carter, former USDA official
 Jeff Chapman, state representative
 Bob Johnson, surgeon
 Earl Martin, physician
 John McCallum, venture capitalist

Withdrawn
 Stefan Jarvis, realtor
 David Schwarz, former congressional aide

Declined
Jack Kingston, incumbent U.S. Representative

Polling

Endorsements

Primary results

Runoff

Democratic primary

Candidates

Nominee 
 Brian Reese, UPS manager and minister

Eliminated in primary
 Marc Smith, navy veteran
 Amy Tavio, realtor

Withdrawn
 Lesli Messinger, businesswoman

Primary results

Runoff

General election

Endorsements

Polling

Results

District 2
Incumbent Democratic representative Sanford Bishop has represented southwest Georgia since 1993.

Democratic primary

Candidates

Nominee 
Sanford Bishop, incumbent U.S. Representative

Republican primary

Candidates

Nominee 
Greg Duke, optician and former Lee County School Board member

Eliminated in primary
Vivian Childs, retired educator

Declined
 John House, business consultant, Army veteran and nominee for this seat in 2012

Primary results

General election

Endorsements

Results

District 3
Incumbent Republican representative Lynn Westmoreland, who has represented West-Central Georgia since 2005, was mentioned as a candidate for the U.S. Senate, but he declined to run. He was opposed in the Republican primary by businessman Chip Flanegan, but prevailed and was unopposed in the general election.

Republican primary

Candidates

Nominee 
Lynn Westmoreland, incumbent U.S. Representative

Eliminated in primary
Chip Flanegan, businessman

Primary results

General election

Endorsements

Results

District 4
Incumbent Democratic representative Hank Johnson has represented the DeKalb County-based district since 2007. He was opposed for renomination in the Democratic primary by DeKalb County Sheriff Tom Brown. Despite Brown raising the adequate funds to run a credible challenge to the incumbent, Johnson won with 55% to Brown's 45%.

Democratic primary

Candidates

Nominee 
Hank Johnson, incumbent U.S. Representative

Eliminated in primary
Tom Brown, DeKalb County Sheriff

Primary results

General election

Endorsements

Results

District 5
Incumbent Democratic representative John Lewis has represented the Atlanta-based district since 1987. He was unopposed in the primary election as well as in the general election.

Democratic primary

Candidates

Nominee 
John Lewis, incumbent U.S. Representative

Primary results

General election

Endorsements

Results

District 6
Incumbent Republican representative Tom Price was a potential candidate for U.S. Senate, but ultimately declined to enter the race. Businessman and army veteran Bob Montigel was the Democratic candidate.

Republican primary

Candidates

Nominee
Tom Price, incumbent U.S. Representative

Primary results

Democratic primary

Candidates

Nominee
Bob Montigel, businessman and Army veteran

Primary results

General election

Endorsements

Results

District 7
Incumbent Republican representative Rob Woodall, who has represented the Gwinnett County-based district since 2011, was mentioned as a candidate for the U.S. Senate, but he declined to run. Woodall will be opposed by Lilburn City Councilman Thomas Wight as the Democratic candidate.

Republican primary

Candidates

Nominee
Rob Woodall, incumbent U.S. Representative

Primary results

Democratic primary

Candidates

Nominee
Thomas Wight, City Councilman

Primary results

General election

Endorsements

Results

District 8
Incumbent Republican representative Austin Scott, who has represented central Georgia since 2011, was mentioned as a candidate for the U.S. Senate, but he declined to run. He was unopposed in the primary election and was unopposed in the general election.

Republican primary

Candidates

Nominee
Austin Scott, incumbent U.S. Representative

Primary results

General election

Endorsements

Results

District 9
Incumbent Republican representative Doug Collins, who has represented northeastern Georgia since January 2013, was mentioned as a candidate for the U.S. Senate, but he declined to run. He defeated Bernie Fontaine for renomination and will be opposed by Democratic medical researcher David Vogel in the general election.

Republican primary

Candidates

Nominee
Doug Collins, incumbent U.S. Representative

Eliminated in primary
Bernie Fontaine

Primary results

Democratic primary

Candidates

Nominee
David Vogel, medical researcher

General election

Endorsements

Results

District 10
Incumbent Republican representative Paul Broun did not run for re-election, instead running unsuccessfully for the U.S. Senate seat held by retiring Republican Saxby Chambliss.

Republican primary

Candidates

Nominee
 Jody Hice, pastor and candidate for Georgia's 7th congressional district in 2010

Eliminated in primary
 S. Mitchell Swan, United States Marine Corps Reservist 
 Mike Collins, trucking executive and son of former U.S. Representative Mac Collins
 Gary Gerrard, attorney
 Donna Sheldon, state representative 
 Stephen Simpson, businessman
 Brian Slowinski, former chairman of the Columbia County Republican Party

Withdrawn
 John Douglas, former state senator

Declined
 Bill Cowsert, state senator
 John Lunsford, former state representative
 Paul Broun, incumbent U.S. Representative

Polling

 ^ Internal poll for Mike Collins campaign

Primary results

Runoff

Democratic primary

Candidates

Nominee
 Ken Dious, attorney

Declined
 Mike Thurmond, former Commissioner of Labor and nominee for the U.S. Senate in 2010

Primary results

General election

Endorsements

Results

District 11
Incumbent Republican representative Phil Gingrey did not run for re-election, instead running unsuccessfully for the U.S. Senate seat held by retiring Republican Saxby Chambliss.

Democrat Patrick Thompson, a technology sales executive and the nominee for the seat in 2012, planned to run again, but ultimately declined to do so.

Republican primary

Candidates

Nominee
 Barry Loudermilk, state senator

Eliminated in primary
 Bob Barr, former U.S. Representative and Libertarian Party Presidential nominee in 2008
 Allan Levene, businessman
 Ed Lindsey,  Majority Whip of the Georgia House of Representatives
 Larry Mrozinski, U.S. Army veteran
 Tricia Pridemore, businesswoman and former State Workforce Development Executive Director

Withdrawn
 Hayden Collins, radio talk show host
 Susan M. Davis, cancer research activist

Declined
 Phil Gingrey, incumbent U.S. Representative
 Judson Hill, state senator

Polling

Primary results

Runoff

Polling

Results

Democratic primary

Candidates

Declined
Patrick Thompson, technology sales executive and nominee for this seat in 2012

General election

Endorsements

Results

District 12
Incumbent Democratic representative John Barrow, who has represented southeastern Georgia since 2005, was mentioned as a candidate for the U.S. Senate, but he declined to run.

Democratic primary

Candidates

Nominee
John Barrow, incumbent U.S. Representative

Primary results

Republican primary

Nominee 
 Rick W. Allen, businessman and candidate for this seat in 2012

Eliminated in primary 
 Delvis Dutton, state representative
 John Stone, Congressional aide and nominee for this seat in 2008
 Diane Vann, army nurse and candidate for Georgia's 8th congressional district in 2010
 Eugene Yu, businessman

Declined 
 Deke Copenhaver, Mayor of Augusta
 Wright McLeod, real estate lawyer and retired Navy commander and candidate for this seat in 2012
 Tommie Williams, state senator

Polling

Primary results

General election

Campaign
Despite spending most of the campaign at a financial disadvantage to the incumbent, the Allen campaign capitalized on a Barrow fundraising letter sent during the 2012 campaign saying that he had voted with President Obama, who's approval was at an all-time low, 85 percent of the time. Despite PolitiFact rating the NRCC ads highlighting this as "Mostly False", they were nevertheless credited as helping to nationalize the race in a way that was damaging to Barrow.

Endorsements

Polling

Debates
Complete video of debate, October 26, 2014

Predictions

Results

District 13
Incumbent Democratic representative David Scott has represented the western and southern portions of the Atlanta metropolitan area since 2003. Michael Owens, a businessman and Marine Corps veteran, ran against Scott in the primary, but was defeated. Scott was unopposed in the general election.

Democratic primary

Candidates

Nominee
David Scott, incumbent U.S. Representative

Eliminated in primary
Michael Owens, businessman and Marine Corps veteran

Primary results

General election

Endorsements

Results

District 14
Incumbent Republican representative Tom Graves, who has represented northwestern Georgia since 2010, was mentioned as a candidate for the U.S. Senate, but he declined to run. He was unsuccessfully challenged in the Republican primary by manager and business consultant Ken Herron, and was unopposed in the general election.

Republican primary

Candidates

Nominee
Tom Graves, incumbent U.S. Representative

Eliminated in primary
Ken Herron, business consultant

Primary results

General election

Endorsements

Results

See also
 2014 United States House of Representatives elections
 2014 United States elections

References

External links
U.S. House elections in Georgia, 2014 at Ballotpedia
Campaign contributions at OpenSecrets

Georgia
2014
United States House of Representatives